Longleat is a historic house in Nashville, Tennessee, U.S.. It was built from 1928 to 1932 for Thomas J. Tyne. It was designed by architect Bryant Fleming. It has been listed on the National Register of Historic Places since February 16, 1984.

References

Houses on the National Register of Historic Places in Tennessee
Houses completed in 1932
Houses in Nashville, Tennessee
National Register of Historic Places in Davidson County, Tennessee